Inka Tampu or Inkatampu (Quechua for "Inca inn", hispanicized spellings Incatambo, Inkatambo, Inca Tambo, Ingatambo) may refer to:

 Inka Tampu, Cajamarca, an archaeological site in the Cajamarca Region, Peru
 Inka Tampu, Huayopata, an archaeological site in the Huayopata District, La Convención Province, Cusco Region, Peru
 Inka Tampu, Vilcabamba, an archaeological site in the Vilcabamba District, La Convención Province, Cusco Region, Peru